Coney Island is a 1928 American silent drama film directed by Ralph Ince and starring Lois Wilson, Lucille Mendez, and Eugene Strong. Its survival status is listed as unknown, which suggests that it is a lost film.

Cast
 Lois Wilson as Joan Wellman  
 Lucille Mendez as Joy Carroll  
 Eugene Strong as Tammany Burke 
 Rudolph Cameron as Bob Wainwright  
 William Irving as Hughey Cooper  
 Gus Leonard as Jingles Wellman  
 Orlo Sheldon as Cooper's Aide  
 Carl Axzelle as Grimes

References

Bibliography
 Quinlan, David. The Illustrated Guide to Film Directors. Batsford, 1983.

External links

1928 films
Films directed by Ralph Ince
American silent feature films
1920s English-language films
American black-and-white films
Film Booking Offices of America films
Silent American drama films
1928 drama films
Films set in Coney Island
1920s American films